is a Japanese multinational corporation which produces sports equipment designed for a wide range of sports. The headquarters are in Kobe, Japan.

Olympic Committees
 Gambia
 Philippines

Football

Club teams
  Chavdar Etropole
  Real Siderano
  FC Imabari
  Vissel Kobe
  KF Trepça'89
  Scottish Kelpies

Players

  David Suazo
  Noel Valladares
  Mario Yepes
  Salvatore Aronica
  Fabio Grosso
  Paolo De Ceglie
  Antonio Di Natale
  Giulio Migliaccio
  Andrés Iniesta
  Yoshikatsu Kawaguchi
  Alessandro dos Santos
  Shinji Ono 
  Cheick Diabaté
  Arata Izumi
  Takehiro Tomiyasu

Australian football

Club teams
  Western Bulldogs

Players
  Brent Harvey
  Jarryd Roughead
  Joel Selwood
  Kurt Tippett
  Nick Turner
  William Clemett

Baseball

  Chunichi Dragons 
  Ichiro Suzuki (wore Asics cleats)
  Yu Darvish
  Shohei Ohtani

Basketball

  Nagoya Diamond Dolphins

Cricket

National teams

Players

 Glenn Maxwell
 Mitchell Starc
 Bhuvneshwar Kumar
 Jasprit Bumrah
 Ravindra Jadeja
 Babar Azam

Cycling
Asics sponsored the Asics–CGA cycling team in 1997 and 1998.

Field hockey

Players
  Eddie Ockenden
  Mark Knowles (field hockey)

Roller hockey

club teams
  Breganze (Since the 2013/2014 season)

Golf

Players
  Shingo Katayama
  Rui Kitada
  Hideki Matsuyama

Handball

National teams

Club teams
 Montpellier
 RK Crvena zvezda

Netball

National Teams
 Australian Diamonds

Club Teams 

 Adelaide Thunderbirds
 New South Wales Swifts
 Queensland Firebirds
 West Coast Fever
 Melbourne Vixens
 Canterbury Tactix
 Central Pulse
 Northern Mystics
 Southern Steel
 Waikato/Bay of Plenty Magic

Players
 Kimberlee Green
 Laura Geitz
 Madison Robinson

Rugby League

Club teams
 Brisbane Broncos

Players
 Reagan Campbell Gillard
 Boyd Cordner
 Cooper Cronk
 Greg Inglis
 James Maloney
 Johnathan Thurston
 Isaah Yeo

Rugby union

National teams

Club teams
 Buildcorp NRC
 Amatori Rugby San Donà

Players
  David Pocock
  Stephen Moore (rugby union)
  Bernard Foley
  Reece Hodge
  Adam Ashley-Cooper
  James Horwill
  Charlotte Caslick
  Tendai Mtawarira
  Eben Etzebeth
  Elton Jantjies
  Damian de Allende
  Werner Kok
  Chris Henry (rugby union)
  Ardie Savea

Swimming
  Tomoko Hagiwara
  Yuko Nakanisi
  Penny Oleksiak

Tennis

  Alex De Minaur
  Akira Santillan
  Alex Bolt
  Maverick Banes
  James Duckworth
  Marinko Matosevic
  Samantha Stosur
  Alexander Peya
  David Goffin
  Bruno Soares
  Alexander Donski
  Leylah Fernandez
  Vasek Pospisil
  Nicolás Jarry
  Borna Ćorić
  María José Martínez Sánchez
  Stéphanie Foretz Gacon
  Caroline Garcia
  Hugo Gaston
  Gaël Monfils
  Virginie Razzano
  Kenny de Schepper
  Florent Serra
  Harriet Dart
  Johanna Konta (Shoes Only)
  Brydan Klein
  Jonathan Marray
  Julia Görges
  Yuki Bhambri
  Filippo Volandri
  Fabio Fognini (Shoes Only)
  Ai Sugiyama
  Jesse Huta Galung
  Iga Świątek
  Jakub Wójcicki (Shoes Only)
  Frederico Gil
  Maria João Köhler
  Novak Djokovic (Shoes Only)
  William Blumberg
  Coco Vandeweghe
  Theodore McDonald
  Sebastian Mermersky
  Brandon Holt
  Jennifer Brady

Table Tennis
  Nissan Table Tennis
  Tokyo Art Table Tennis
  Citizen Micro Human Tech Table Tennis

Track and Field

Associations 
 World Athletics

National teams

  Bulgaria
  Cyprus
  Japan
  Korea
  Mauritius
  Morocco
  Netherlands
  Ukraine

Club teams
  Samsung Electronics Athletic Club
  ASICS Wests Athletics Club

Athletes 
Asics is the official sponsor of the Los Angeles Marathon.

 Irene Siragusa
 Marzia Caravelli
 Tom Bosworth
 Nathan Fox
 Dewi Griffiths
 Josh Griffiths
 Eilish McColgan
 Luke Gunn
 Viktor Röthlin
 Bastien Auzeil
 Emmanuel Biron
 Christophe Lemaitre
 Romain Martin
 Antoinette Nana Djimou
 Deena Kastor
 Ryan Hall
 April Steiner-Bennett
 Julie Culley
 Heather Kampf
 Diego Estrada
 Sara Hall
 Emma Bates
 Sharon Day
 Jake Arnold
 Johnny Gregorek
 Kara Winger
 Elizabeth Patterson
 Russell Winger
 Candace Hill
 Queen Harrison
 Ryan Martin
 Lolo Jones
 Jarrion Lawson
 Tabor Stevens
 Adriana Nelson
 Shadrack Biwott
 Lauren Jimison
 Becky Wade
 Scott Bauhs
 Josphat Boit
 Miles Batty
 Allie Kieffer
 Clayton Young
 Charles Philibert-Thiboutot
 Lanni Marchant
 David Le Porho
 Lucas Bruchet
 Natasha Wodak
 Priscilla Frederick
 Brigita Virbalytė-Dimšienė
 Anouk Vetter
 Dennis Licht
 Bart van Nunen
 Tyrone Smith
 Diane Nukuri
 Tero Pitkamaki
 Antti Ruuskanen
 Thomas Van der Plaetsen
 Jesse Stroobants
 Jeroen D'Hoedt
 Kim Ruell
 Choe Byeong-kwang
 Yoshihide Kiryu 
 Naoko Takahashi 
 Mizuki Noguchi
 Honami Maeda
 Chisato Fukushima
 Julian Walsh
 Yuzo Kanemaru
 Konomi Kai
 Ayuko Suzuki
 Hanami Sekine
 Kelsey-Lee Barber
 Sarah Carli
 Jarrod Geddes
 Kimberley Mickle
 Brandon Starc
 Dani Stevens
 Jared Tallent
 Jessica Trengove

Gallery

Triathlon

 Emma Moffatt
 Pete Jacobs
 Matt Reed
 Jan Frodeno
 Andy Potts
 Pete Jacobs
 Cait Snow
 Helen Jenkins
 Matt Reed
 Amelie Kretz
 Jeff Symonds
 Thiago Vinhal

Volleyball

Associations

National teams

 Men / Women

 Men / Women

 Men
 Men

Colleges and universities
 Oregon State

Club teams
 
 Asan Woori Card Hansae
 Cheonan Hyundai Capital Skywalkers
 Gumi LIG Insurance Greaters
 Suwon KEPCO 45
 Hweong IBK Altos
 Materdomini Volley
 Libertas Brianza
 Cuneo V.C.
 Cuatto Volley Giaveno
 Bakery Volley
 Constanța
 OK Crvena zvezda

Athletes 

 Yuji Nishida
 Masahiro Yanagida

Notes

References

Asics
ASICS